Ingvar Sandström (born 3 September 1942) is a Swedish cross-country skier who competed in the late 1960s and early 1970s. He won the 4 × 10 km relay bronze at the 1970 FIS Nordic World Ski Championships in Vysoké Tatry.

Sandström also finished fourth in the 30 km event at the 1966 FIS Nordic World Ski Championships in Oslo and competed in the 30 km event at the 1968 Winter Olympics. At the 1972 Winter Olympics he was a reserve member of the Swedish team.

Cross-country skiing results
All results are sourced from the International Ski Federation.

Olympic Games

World Championships
 1 medal – (1 bronze)

References

External links
World Championship results 

1942 births
Living people
Swedish male cross-country skiers
FIS Nordic World Ski Championships medalists in cross-country skiing
Olympic cross-country skiers of Sweden
Cross-country skiers at the 1968 Winter Olympics